Gold Award for Best Actress in a Negative Role is an award given by Zee TV as part of its annual Gold Awards for Indian television series and artists, to recognize an actor who has delivered an outstanding performance in a supporting role.

The award was first awarded in 2007 and since has been separated in two categories, Critics Award and Popular Award. Critics Award is given by the chosen jury of critics assigned to the function while Popular Award is given on the basis of public voting.

Anita Hassanandani has won 4 awards out of 4 nominations. Kanika Maheshwari and Kamya Panjabi have won 2 awards each with 3 and 2 nominations respectively.

List of winners

2000s
2007 Kamya Panjabi - Banoo Main Teri Dulhann as Sindoora Pratap Singh
Suvarna Jha - Kyunki Saas Bhi Kabhi Bahu Thi as Trupti
Nimisha Vakharia - Teen Bahuraaniyaan as Kokila
Aruna Irani - Maayka - Saath Zindagi Bhar Ka as Durga
Urvashi Dholakia - Kasautii Zindagii Kay as Komolika
Karishma Tanna - Ek Ladki Anjaani Si as Ayesha
 Moonmoon Banerjee -  Kasautii Zindagii Kay as Sampada
Ashwini Kalsekar - Kasamh Se as Jigyasaa
Sanjeeda Sheikh - Kayamath as Ayesha
2008 Sanjeeda Sheikh - Kayamath as Ayesha
Kamya Panjabi - Banoo Main Teri Dulhann as Sindoora
Ashwini Kalsekar - Kasamh Se as Jigyasaa
Suvarna Jha - Kyunki Saas Bhi Kabhi Bahu Thi as Tripti 
Pallavi Subhash Shirke - Kasamh Se as Meera
2009 Not Held

2010s
2010 Rashami Desai - Uttaran as Tapasya Thakur
Parvati Sehgal - Mann Kee Awaaz Pratigya as Komal
Hunar Hali - 12/24 Karol Bagh as Mili 
Surekha Sikri - Balika Vadhu as Kalyani Devi
Meghna Malik - Na Aana Is Des Laado as Ammaji 
Sushmita Mukherjee - Agle Janam Mohe Bitiya Hi Kijo as Gangiya 
Usha Nadkarni - Pavitra Rishta as Savita Deshmukh
2011 Usha Nadkarni - Pavitra Rishta as Savita Deshmukh
Pratima Kazmi - Uttaran as Naani
Aashka Goradia - Laagi Tujhse Lagan as Kalavati Tai
Reshmi Ghosh - Tere Liye as Nupur
Shivshakti Sachdev - Afsar Bitiya as Pinky Raj
2012 Kanika Maheshwari - Diya Aur Baati Hum as Meenakshi Rathi
Pratima Kazmi - Uttaran as Naani
Eva Grover - Bade Achhe Lagte Hain as Niharika Kapoor
Usha Nadkarni - Pavitra Rishta as Savita Deshmukh
Jyotsana Chandola - Sasural Simar Ka as Billo
Mona Vasu - Parichay—Nayee Zindagi Kay Sapno Ka as Richa Thakral 
2013 Kanika Maheshwari - Diya Aur Baati Hum as Meenakshi Rathi
Aanchal Khurana - Sapne Suhane Ladakpan Ke as Charu Mayank Garg
Jyotsana Chandola - Sasural Simar Ka as Billo
Mouli Ganguly - Kya Huaa Tera Vaada as Anushka Bhalla
Adaa Khan - Amrit Manthan as Amrit Kaur Sodi
Seema Mishra - Madhubala - Ek Ishq Ek Junoon as Deepali Bhatia
2014 Anita Hassanandani - Ye Hai Mohabbatein as Shagun Arora
Ashwini Kalsekar - Jodha Akbar as Mahamanga
Simone Singh - Ek Hasina Thi as Sakshi Goenka
Aashka Goradia - Bharat Ka Veer Putra – Maharana Pratap as Maharani
Monica Bedi - Saraswatichandra as Ghuman
Nigaar Khan - Main Naa Bhoolungi as Madhurima Aditya Jagannath
2015 Anita Hassanandani - Ye Hai Mohabbatein as Shagun Arora
Shraddha Arya - Dream Girl as Ayesha
Shweta Tiwari - Begusarai as Bindia
Tejaswi Prakash Wayangankar - Swaragini as Ragini
Additi Gupta - Qubool Hai as Sanam
Sarita Joshi - Meri Aashiqui Tum Se Hi as Hansa Parekh
Shikha Singh - Kumkum Bhagya as Aliya Mehra
Ashwini Kalsekar - Jodha Akbar as Mahamanga
2016 Anita Hassanandani - Ye Hai Mohabbatein as Shagun Arora
Shikha Singh - Kumkum Bhagya as Aliya Mehra
Adaa Khan - Naagin as Shesha
Sudha Chandran - Naagin as Yamini
Eva Grover - Tashan-e-Ishq as Anita Luthra
Achint Kaur - Jamai Raja as Durga Devi
2017 Anita Hassanandani - Ye Hai Mohabbatein as Shagun Arora (tied with) Kamya Panjabi - Shakti - Astitva Ke Ehsaas Ki as Preeto Singh
Shikha Singh - Kumkum Bhagya as Aliya Mehra
Pavitra Punia - Ye Hai Mohabbatein as Nidhi Chabbra
Ridhi Dogra - Woh Apna Sa as Nisha Jindal
Adaa Khan - Naagin (season 2) as Shesha
Sudha Chandran - Naagin (season 2) as Yamini
Aashka Goradia - Naagin (season 2) as Queen Avantika
2018 Shikha Singh - Kumkum Bhagya as Aliya Mehra
Pallavi Pradhan - Jiji Maa as Uttara Devi
Ruhi Chaturvedi - Kundali Bhagya as Sherlyn Khurrana
Aalisha Panwar - Ishq Mein Marjawan as Tara Raichand
Gauri Pradhan - Tu Aashiqui as Anita Sharma
Leena Jumani - Kumkum Bhagya as Tanushree Mehta
2019 Hina Khan - Kasautii Zindagii Kay as Komolika Anurag Basu
Shikha Singh - Kumkum Bhagya as Aliya Mehra
Ruhi Chaturvedi - Kundali Bhagya as Sherlyn Khurrana
Helly Shah - Sufiyana Pyaar Mera as Kaynaat Shah
Rakshanda Khan - Naagin (season 3) as Sumitra Sehgal
Antara Biswas -Nazar as Mohana

References

Best Actress in a Negative Role